Honor Rising: Japan was a professional wrestling event co-promoted by the Japanese New Japan Pro-Wrestling (NJPW) and American Ring of Honor (ROH) promotions. The event was held annually from 2016 to 2019, taking place in Japan (as opposed to the Global Wars and War of the Worlds series, which the two promotions co-promote in North America).

Events

References

External links
Official New Japan Pro-Wrestling website 
Official Ring of Honor website